Mohammad Abbas Afridi (born 5 April 2001) is a Pakistani cricketer who plays for Khyber Pakhtunkhwa.

Personal life
Abbas Afridi was born on 5 April 2001 in Peshawar, Khyber Pakhtunkhwa.

He is the nephew of former Pakistan international cricketer and fellow fast bowler Umar Gul.

Domestic career
In September 2018, Afridi made his List A debut for Habib Bank Limited in the 2018–19 Quaid-e-Azam One Day Cup. 

In October 2018, he made his first-class debut for Habib Bank Limited in the 2018–19 Quaid-e-Azam Trophy.

In December 2019, he was named in Pakistan's squad for the 2020 Under-19 Cricket World Cup. He remained leading wicket-taker for Pakistan in the tournament.

In February 2021, he joined Karachi Kings for the 2021 PSL. The next month, he made his Twenty20 debut for the team. 

In October 2021, he was named in the Pakistan Shaheens squad for their tour of Sri Lanka.

References

External links
 

2001 births
Living people
Pashtun people
Afridi people
Pakistani cricketers
Habib Bank Limited cricketers
Karachi Kings cricketers
Multan Sultans cricketers
Cricketers from Peshawar